Old woman may refer to:

 Old Woman (goddess), a divine hag in Irish and Scottish mythology

Places
 Old Woman Mountains, a mountain range south of Essex, California, USA
 Old Woman River, a river in Ontario, Canada
 Old Woman's Gulch, a ravine in Tacoma, Washington, USA
 Old Woman's Island, one of the seven islands composing the city of Mumbai, India

Other
 Old woman, popular name of the plant species of wormwood Artemisia maritima
 Old Woman meteorite, a large meteorite found in California
 The Old Woman, a novella by Daniil Kharms
 The Old Woman, a play by Robert Wilson

See also
 
 "Crabbit Old Woman", poem
 Crone
 Hag
 Old lady (disambiguation)
 Old man (disambiguation)